Obi Muonelo (born June 21, 1988) is a former American professional basketball player who last played for Austin Toros of the NBA Development League. He played collegiately with the Oklahoma State Cowboys.

Professional
Muonelo went undrafted in the 2010 NBA Draft and signed a summer league contract with the Philadelphia 76ers. Muonelo was selected with the 10th overall pick in the 2010 NBA Development League Draft by the Fort Wayne Mad Ants.

For the 2011/12 NBA D-League season, Muonelo will be playing for the Austin Toros.

Santa Fe High School
At Edmond Santa Fe High School in Edmond, Oklahoma Muonelo averaged 19.6 points, 6.1 rebounds, 2.9 steals and 4.9 assists his senior year. He was the 19th prospect overall and the fourth best shooting guard. Obi led his team to the 6A state championship game where they ended their season at a 25-4. In his junior year he averaged 18.0 points and 10.2 rebounds

References

External links
 Obi Muonelo OK State player profile

1988 births
Living people
Austin Toros players
Oklahoma State Cowboys basketball players
Fort Wayne Mad Ants players
Basketball players from Oklahoma
Sportspeople from Edmond, Oklahoma
American men's basketball players
Small forwards
Shooting guards